Single domain can refer to:

 Single-domain antibody, an antibody fragment consisting of a single variable domain
 Single domain (magnetic), state of a ferromagnet in which the magnetization does not vary across the magnet